Wounded Rhymes is the second studio album by Swedish singer and songwriter Lykke Li. It was released on 25 February 2011 by LL Recordings and Atlantic Records. Written in Los Angeles and recorded in Stockholm, the album was produced by Björn Yttling of Peter Bjorn and John, who also handled production for Li's debut album, Youth Novels (2008).

Upon its release, Wounded Rhymes received acclaim from music critics, who viewed it as an improvement on its predecessor. It produced four singles, including "I Follow Rivers", which charted inside the top five in several European countries.

Background and writing
Li spent six months writing the album in the Echo Park neighbourhood of Los Angeles, while visiting the desert, rewatching Alejandro Jodorowsky's 1973 film The Holy Mountain and listening to Alan Lomax field recordings, eventually coming up with songs she calls "hypnotic, psychotic and more primal". In an interview with Pitchfork on 18 November 2010, when asked if lead single "Get Some" was an indicative of the rest of the album, Li responded:
"It's just a snapshot, but the album is darker, moodier, and the lyrics are heavier. There's less atmosphere, more directness. I was 19 when I recorded my first album, and I've been exposed to many things during these last few years; all the baby fat is gone. I dove into the craziness and did things that maybe I would think twice about when I get older. And I'm a really restless person; I'm tired of the way I sounded or looked yesterday. So it's hard to hang onto this image of me as this young Swedish female in this world. People comment on how you look, it's so unnecessary. I just wanted people to listen to what I have to say instead of focusing on anything else. And, of course, there are a lot of things I'm angry about in the world."

During the same interview, she also explained her decision to write the album in Los Angeles:
"I'm from Sweden so I don't enjoy winter at all; there's nothing cute about it. Right now I'm in Stockholm, and it's so fucking cold and dark. I have such a dark mood in myself already so I don't need things to be darker.

I was totally romanticizing the idea of Los Angeles when the Doors, Joni Mitchell, and Neil Young were hanging out there. I was trying to find David Lynch and Leonard Cohen with no luck. It was just more of a retreat. And Los Angeles is such a mysterious place because there's so much evil in that city, but there's also so much light. You can be totally alone on a hillside and I love that kind of secluded, deserted rawness."

Li unveiled the album's artwork and track listing on her official website on 14 December 2010.

Promotion
Li premiered songs from the album during live performances across Europe in late 2010. She performed at Heimathafen Neukölln in Berlin on 1 November 2010, at La Maroquinerie in Paris on 2 November, at Heaven in London on 4 November, at Kägelbanan in Stockholm on 8 November, and at Klub Wytwórnia in Łódź, Poland, on 20 November. Additionally, she performed at Le Poisson Rouge in New York City on 1 December 2010.

Li performed "Get Some" on Late Night with Jimmy Fallon on 3 March 2011, on Conan on 10 March and on Last Call with Carson Daly on 15 March. Li also toured Europe and North America in promotion of the album, starting at El Rey Theatre at Los Angeles on 9 March 2011.

Singles
"Get Some" was released on 22 October 2010 as the lead single from Wounded Rhymes. Follow-up single "I Follow Rivers" premiered exclusively on Spin magazine's website on 10 January 2011, and was released digitally on 21 January 2011. The single reached number 44 in Li's native Sweden, while becoming a commercial success in several other European countries, reaching number one in Belgium, Germany and Italy, as well as the top five in Austria, France, Ireland, the Netherlands and Switzerland.

"Sadness Is a Blessing" was released as the album's third single on 13 May 2011, followed by "Youth Knows No Pain" on 23 September 2011.

Critical reception

Wounded Rhymes received widespread acclaim from music critics. At Metacritic, which assigns a normalised rating out of 100 to reviews from mainstream publications, the album received an average score of 83, based on 34 reviews, which indicates "universal acclaim". Corey Beasley of PopMatters described it as "a dark record, borne of lost love and youthful frustrations, more suited in tone to the frozen lake country than the haze of sunny SoCal. It means this is a seriously heavy and seriously excellent album." K. Ross Hoffman of AllMusic wrote that Li "hasn't entirely let go of her girlish sweetness, and she certainly hasn't lost her way with a melodic hook, but she's largely outgrown the more cloyingly precious, occasionally clumsy tendencies that sometimes plagued her debut, and her singing voice, while still appealingly personable and distinctive, has gotten considerably more forceful", while praising the album as "an inspired, rugged, smart, emotive, coolly modern piece of indie pop, and an improvement on Lykke Li's debut in just about every respect."

Rolling Stone critic Jody Rosen dubbed the album "a weird-pop gem" containing "torchy love songs that nod to Sixties hits but are stretched into all kinds of shapes." The Observers Hermione Hoby lauded it as "a formidable collection of all-woman 21st-century torch songs that reverberate with vengeance and desolation. The arrangements are still stark and driven by syncopated handclaps and off-kilter drums, but now, voice creaking with heartache, she sounds like she's casting dark spells rather than serenading daydreams." Kevin Liedel of Slant Magazine expressed that the album "is not so much a stylistic departure as it is a stark transformation of mood: Though still an expert dabbler in gravelly electro-pop, Li sounds positively dangerous now, her voice tormented, biting, and weapon-like, and her accompaniments following suit." Sean Fennessey of Spin stated that the album is "equal parts seething ice princess and lonely snowwoman, vacillating almost track by track between fury and despondence over a scotched relationship", adding that "[t]he dual objectives—weep for me, fear me—collide throughout, creating a dicey, but gripping album."

In a review for Pitchfork, Stephen M. Deusner viewed Wounded Rhymes as "an album of stark, scintillating contrasts: between fantasy and reality, between the powerful and the vulnerable, between the brash and the quiet, between the rhythmic and the melodic." Amanda Petrusich of Entertainment Weekly commented, "While her 2008 breakout, Youth Novels, was quirky and coy, Wounded Rhymes is hungry, dark, dirty." Jazz Monroe of NME concluded that "for all its wailing codas, swollen strings and silky production, Wounded Rhymes, while a bold statement, doesn't quite strike the same lugubrious groove. But while we bemoan flash-in-the-pan pop stars, it's encouraging to see someone like Lykke sparking attention." August Brown of the Los Angeles Times felt that the album is "full of charged contradictions. She's a mediocre singer with a very interesting voice, a fan of classic handmade pop and the ways laptops can serrate it, and a writer obsessed with sex and with sexing up obsession."

Commercial performance
As of January 2012, UK sales stand at 26,391 copies. As of 2014 it had sold 97,000 copies in United States.

Accolades

Track listing

Note
 The vinyl version of the 10th anniversary edition does not include the track "Made You Move".

Personnel
Credits adapted from the liner notes of Wounded Rhymes.

Musicians

 Lykke Li – vocals ; percussion 
 Zhala Rifat – backing vocals 
 Mariam Wallentin – backing vocals 
 Björn Yttling – bass ; organ ; percussion ; backing vocals ; piano ; guitars 
 Rick Nowels – guitar ; organ ; piano 
 Lars Skoglund – drums ; percussion 
 John Eriksson – drums ; percussion 
 Dag Lundquist – percussion 
 Anders Stenberg – guitar ; backing vocals 
 Micke Svensson – percussion ; organ ; guitar 
 Dean Reid – percussion 
 Lasse Mårtén – percussion

Technical

 Björn Yttling – production, recording
 Lasse Mårtén – mixing, recording
 Janne Hansson – recording
 Hans Stenlund – recording
 Henrik Jonsson – mastering

Artwork
 Roger Deckker – photos
 Leif Podhajsky – artwork

Charts

Weekly charts

Year-end charts

Release history

References

2011 albums
Albums produced by Björn Yttling
Atlantic Records albums
Lykke Li albums